Chaparral Star Academy is a public charter school in Austin, Texas. It is an open-enrollment, publicly funded charter school in Austin, Texas. The students often participate in out-of-school activities, such as national figure skating, gymnastics, and equestrian competitions. Chaparral Star Academy offers an intensive curriculum designed for students making use of a more compact daily schedule. Students may choose from a morning session or an afternoon session. The schedule is ideal for highly motivated students involved in major programs outside of the classroom and families in need of a more flexible daily schedule.

Lower school
Grades K-5, core subjects

Middle school
Grade 6–8, high school preparatory curriculum, core subjects which allows students the opportunity to earn high school credits.

Upper school
Grade 9–12, college preparatory curriculum based on the State of Texas Distinguished high school graduation requirements, AP level instruction in most core subjects, broad range of electives, college-bound literature studies, and activities including Martial Arts and award-winning Speech and Debate. 11th and 12th grade students are strongly encouraged to participate in ACC's dual credit program, earning both high school and college credit simultaneously.

Grade K-6 are limited to 15 students; middle school and high school is limited to 20.

First graduating class: 2001

School Awards

A 2008 National Charter School of the Year

Rated Exemplary by the TEA in 2009 and 2010 

A 5-Year TEA Recognized Campus 2006-2008

21 Gold Performance Awards

Ranked as the number 1 Public High School in Austin by Children at Risk in 2012

A 2016 National Speech and Debate Association Middle School of Excellence

References

External links
Official site

Charter schools in Texas
Public high schools in Texas
Public middle schools in Texas
Public elementary schools in Texas
Schools in Travis County, Texas
Educational institutions established in 1998
1998 establishments in Texas